Sergio García Blanco (born 27 December 1996) is a Spanish footballer who plays for Loja CD as a left winger.

Club career
Born in Rota, Cádiz, Andalusia, García joined Córdoba CF's youth setup in 2005, aged nine. He made his debuts as a senior with the reserves, representing the side in both Segunda División B and Tercera División.

García made his first team – and La Liga – debut on 23 May 2015, coming on as a late substitute for Fidel in a 0–3 away loss against SD Eibar, as his side was already relegated. It was his maiden appearance for the main squad, and subsequently represented CA Espeleño and Loja CD in the fourth division.

References

External links

1996 births
Living people
People from Rota, Andalusia
Sportspeople from the Province of Cádiz
Spanish footballers
Footballers from Andalusia
Association football midfielders
La Liga players
Segunda División B players
Tercera División players
Córdoba CF B players
Córdoba CF players
Loja CD players